Alan Ehrlick (born 4 April 1946) is a Canadian equestrian. He competed in two events at the 1968 Summer Olympics.

References

1946 births
Living people
Canadian male equestrians
Olympic equestrians of Canada
Equestrians at the 1968 Summer Olympics
Sportspeople from Toronto